Senator Breeden may refer to:

Brick Breeden (1904–1977), Montana State Senate
Shirley Breeden (born 1955), Nevada State Senate